The District No. 98 Schoolhouse, also known as the Stockton School, is a historic school located at 19 South Main Street in the borough of Stockton in Hunterdon County, New Jersey. It was added to the National Register of Historic Places on January 12, 2005, for its significance in education.

History
The first school building to be located on the site was constructed in 1832. The current school, designed with High Victorian Gothic style by local Lambertville architect James Bird, was constructed from 1872–1873. The 1832 school's cornerstone was retained for the 1872 school. The school building had just two classrooms, and within just a few years, the school was crowded due to the increased population of the Stockton area. In 1884, a front addition to the school was constructed. The addition included a third classroom and a basement coal room, which would be eventually converted into a fourth classroom. Since the 1884 addition, the exterior of the building has remained largely unchanged. In 1952, the interior of the building was renovated to add a boys' restroom and a girls' restroom. At the time of the building's nomination to the National Register of Historic Places, it was still in use as a neighborhood school. The 2017–2018 school year was the schoolhouse's final year of use as a school.

See also
 National Register of Historic Places listings in Hunterdon County, New Jersey

References

Stockton, New Jersey
Defunct schools in New Jersey
National Register of Historic Places in Hunterdon County, New Jersey
New Jersey Register of Historic Places
School buildings on the National Register of Historic Places in New Jersey
Gothic Revival architecture in New Jersey